Kenneth Anderson (23 July 1875 – 27 August 1900) was a Scottish footballer, who played as a goalkeeper for Queen's Park and Scotland.

References

External links
London Hearts profile

1875 births
1900 deaths
Footballers from Glasgow
Association football goalkeepers
Scottish footballers
Scotland international footballers
Queen's Park F.C. players
Place of death missing